MOOSE, originally an acronym for Man Out Of Space Easiest but later changed to the more professional-sounding Manned Orbital Operations Safety Equipment, was a proposed emergency "bail-out" system capable of bringing a single astronaut safely down from Earth orbit to the planet's surface.
The design was proposed by General Electric in the early 1960s. The system was quite compact, weighing  and fitting inside a suitcase-sized container.

The astronaut would leave the vehicle in a space suit, climb inside the plastic bag, and then fill it with foam. The bag had the shape of a blunt cone, with the astronaut embedded in its base facing the apex of the cone. The rocket pack would protrude from the bag and be used to slow the astronaut's orbital speed enough so that he would reenter Earth's atmosphere, and the foam-filled bag would act as insulation during the subsequent aerobraking. The foam heat shield would serve a final role as cushioning when the astronaut touched down and as a flotation device should they land on water. The radio beacon would guide rescuers.

General Electric performed preliminary testing on some of the components of the MOOSE system, including flying samples of heat shield material on a Mercury mission, inflating a foam-filled bag with a human subject embedded inside, and test-dropping dummies and a human subject in MOOSE foam shields short distances. However, the MOOSE system was nonetheless always intended as an extreme emergency measure when no other option for returning an astronaut to Earth existed; falling from orbit protected by nothing more than a spacesuit and a bag of foam was unlikely to ever become a particularly safe—or enticing—maneuver.

Neither NASA nor the U.S. Air Force expressed an interest in the MOOSE system, and so by the end of the 1960s the program had been quietly shelved.

See also

 Paracone – Inflatable cone-shaped reentry vehicle.
 Personal Rescue Enclosure – Inflatable ball-shaped space suit
 Lunar Escape Systems – Proposed system to rescue Apollo astronauts from lunar surface

References

External links
 Encyclopedia Astronautica article on MOOSE
 Analysis and design of space vehicle flight control systems. Volume 16 - Abort  see page 145

Space technology
Proposed spacecraft